The Highland Park Public Schools is a comprehensive community public school district that serves students in pre-kindergarten through twelfth grade from Highland Park, in Middlesex County, New Jersey, United States.

As of the 2020–21 school year, the district, comprised of four schools, had an enrollment of 1,558 students and 145.7 classroom teachers (on an FTE basis), for a student–teacher ratio of 10.7:1.

The district is classified by the New Jersey Department of Education as being in District Factor Group "GH", the third-highest of eight groupings. District Factor Groups organize districts statewide to allow comparison by common socioeconomic characteristics of the local districts. From lowest socioeconomic status to highest, the categories are A, B, CD, DE, FG, GH, I and J.

Schools

Schools in the district (with 2020–21 enrollment data from the National Center for Education Statistics) are:
Elementary schools
Irving Primary School with 248 students in grades PreK-1
Megan McNally, Principal
Bartle Elementary School with 437 students in grades 2–5
Jennifer Knapp, Principal
Middle school
Highland Park Middle School with 364 students in grades 6–8
Donna Malouf, Interim Principal
High school
Highland Park High School with 477 students in grades 9-12
Michael J. Lassiter, Principal

Administration
Core members of the district's administration are:
Dr. Kristina Nicosia, Superintendent
Linda Hoefele, Business Administrator / Board Secretary

Board of education
The district's board of education is comprised of nine members who set policy and oversee the fiscal and educational operation of the district through its administration. As a Type II school district, the board's trustees are elected directly by voters to serve three-year terms of office on a staggered basis, with three seats up for election each year held (since 2012) as part of the November general election. The board appoints a superintendent to oversee the day-to-day operation of the district.

References

External links
Highland Park Public Schools
 
School Data for the Highland Park Public Schools, National Center for Education Statistics

Highland Park, New Jersey
New Jersey District Factor Group GH
School districts in Middlesex County, New Jersey